Hastings Girls' High School is a girls' high school in Hastings, New Zealand for students in Years 9 to 13. The school is the main all-female secondary school within Hastings City. It was originally a co-ed school, joined with Hastings Boys' High School, until the mid 1950s, when they split into two single sex schools. Hastings Girls' High School has four houses; gold, purple, blue and green. They share an emblem with Hastings Boys' High School; the huia bird.

References

Hastings, New Zealand
Secondary schools in the Hawke's Bay Region
Girls' schools in New Zealand